This is a list of schools in Malacca, Malaysia. It is categorised according to the variants of schools in Malaysia, and is arranged alphabetically.

International School 
These schools provide both the local and expatriate population with British Curriculum Education and are approved Cambridge International Examination Centres.
 KYS International School
 Malacca Expatriate School
 Melaka International School
 UUM International School Melaka

Private Schools
 Wesley Methodist school
 Sekolah Menengah Islam Al-Amin Bestari D'Merlimau

Chinese Independent High School
 Pay Fong High School

National Primary School - Sekolah Kebangsaan 

 Jasin District
 SK Air Baruk
 SK Asahan
 SK Batang Melaka
 SK Bukit Senggeh
 SK Batu Gajah
 SK Bukit Tembakau
 SK Chabau
 SK Chenderah
 SK Chinchin
 SK Chohong
 SK Datuk Haji Baginda
 SK Jasin
 SK Jalan Datuk Palembang
 SK Jus
 SK Kemendor
 SK Kesang Tua
 SK Masjid Baru
 SK Merlimau
 SK Merlimau 1
 SK Merlimau 2
 SK Nyalas
 SK Parit Gantong
 SK Parit Penghulu
 SK Pulai
 SK Sebatu
 SK Selandar
 SK Sempang
 SK Seri Bemban
 SK Seri Machap
 SK Seri Mendapat
 SK Serkam
 SK Serkam Darat
 SK Sungai Rambai
 SK Sri Lanang
 SK Tedong
 SK Tehel
 SK Terentang
 Melaka Tengah District
 SK Alai
 SK Ayer Keroh
 SK Ayer Molek
 SK Bachang
 SK Bandar Hilir
 SK Batu Berendam
 SK Bendahara Seri Maharaja
 SK Bertam Hulu
 SK Bukit Baru
 SK Bukit Beruang
 SK Bukit China
 SK Bukit Lintang
 SK Bukit Rambai
 SK Cheng
 SK Convent of the Infant Jesus 1
 SK Convent of the Infant Jesus 2
 SK Dato' Haji Demang Hussin
 SK Duyong
 SK Jalan Datuk Palembang
 SK Kampong Gelam
 SK Klebang Besar
 SK Kem Gerak Khas
 SK Kerubong
 SK Kubu
 SK Lereh
 SK Limbongan
 SK Malim
 SK Methodist ACS
 SK Padang Temu
 SK Pantai Kudor
 SK Paya Dalam
 SK Paya Rendan
 SK Paya Rumput
 SK Pendidikan Khas
 SK Peringgit
 SK Pernu
 SK Sacred Heart
 SK Semabok
 SK Seri Bandar
 SK Seri Duyong
 SK St Francis
 SK Sungai Udang
 SK Taman Bukit Rambai
 SK Tambak Paya
 SK Tangga Batu
 SK Telok Mas
 SK Tengkera 1
 SK Tengkera 2
 SK Ujong Pasir
 SK Perempuan Durian Daun
 SK Perempuan Methodist 1
 SK Perempuan Methodist 2
 Alor Gajah District
 SK Air Jernih
 SK Alor Gajah 1
 SK Ayer Limau
 SK Ayer Pa'abas
 SK Belimbing Dalam
 SK Berisu
 SK Bukit Beringin
 SK Cherana Puteh
 SK Dato' Naning
 SK Dato' Tambichik Karim
 SK Durian Daun K
 SK Durian Tunggal
 SK Gangsa
 SK Ganun
 SK Hutan Percha
 SK Jeram
 SK Kampung Tengah
 SK Kem Terendak 1
 SK Kem Terendak 2
 SK Kemuning
 SK Kuala Linggi
 SK Lendu
 SK Lubok Redan
 SK Masjid Tanah
 SK Melaka Pindah
 SK Melekek
 SK Menggong
 SK Othman Syawal
 SK Padang Sebang
 SK Parit Melana
 SK Pegoh
 SK Pengkalan Balak
 SK Pulau Sebang
 SK Ramuan China Besar
 SK Ramuan China Kechil
 SK Rantau Panjang
 SK Rumbia
 SK Simpang Empat
 SK Sri Laksamana
 SK Sungai Buloh
 SK Sungai Jernih
 SK Sungai Petai
 SK Sungai Siput
 SK Sungai Tuang
 SK Tanjung Bidara
 SK Tebong
 SK Telok Berembang

Religious Primary School
SRA Telok Mas

Chinese Type Primary and Secondary School

Chinese Secondary school (SMJK) Sekolah Menengah Jenis Kebangsaan
SMJK Notre Dame Convent
SMJK Pulau Sebang
SMJK Yok Bin
Catholic High School
SMJK Tinggi Cina Melaka

Chinese Primary School (SJKC) Sekolah Rendah Jenis Kebangsaan Cina
Jasin District
SJK (C) Chung Hwa 
SJK (C) Parit Keliling
SJK (C) Kemendor 
SJK (C) Merlimau  
SJK (C) Jasin Lalang
SJK (C) On Lok  
SJK (C) Chiao Chee   
SJK (C) Kiow Nam  
SJK (C) Kuang Hwa  
SJK (C) Pay Chiao  
SJK (C) Pay Chuin  
SJK (C) Pay Hsien  
SJK (C) Pay Min   
SJK (C) Pay Yap  
SJK (C) Pondok Batang  
SJK (C) Shuh Yen  
SJK (C) Simpang Bekoh  
SJK (C) Toon Hwa   
SJK (C) Yu Hsien

Melaka Tengah District
 SJK (C) Sungai Udang
 SJK (C) Pay Hwa
 SJK (C) Ping Ming 
 SJK (C) Wen Hwa  
 SJK (C) Chung Kuo 
 SJK (C) Siang Lin
 SJK (C) Pay Fong 1  
 SJK (C) Pay Fong 2  
 SJK (C) Pay Fong 3   
 SJK (C) Poh Lan  
 SJK (C) St Mary
 SJK (C) Bachang
 SJK (C) Bertam Ulu 
 SJK (C) Bukit Beruang   
 SJK (C) Notre Dame  
 SJK (C) Ayer Keroh
 SJK (C) Pay Teck 
 SJK (C) Cheng  
 SJK (C) Ek Te  
 SJK (C) Katholik
 SJK (C) Keh Seng  
 SJK (C) Kuang Yah  
 SJK (C) Lih Jen  
 SJK (C) Malim 
 SJK (C) Tiang Dua 
 SJK (C) Ting Hwa  
 SJK (C) Ying Chye  
 SJK (C) Yok Bin 
 SJK (C) Yu Hwa  
 SJK (C) Yu Ying

Alor Gajah District
SJK (C) Alor Gajah  
SJK (C) Kiow Min  
SJK (C) Lendu  
SJK (C) Machap Baru  
SJK (C) Machap Umboo  
SJK (C) Masjid Tanah   
SJK (C) Paya Mengkuang  
SJK (C) Peng Min Gadek  
SJK (C) Sann Yuh  
SJK (C) Pay Chee 
SJK (C) Sin Wah 
SJK (C) Taboh Naning  
SJK (C) Yok Sin 
SJK（C）Chabau
SJK (C) Sin Min   
SJK (C) Khiak Yew

Tamil Primary School

Jasin District
 SJK (T) Jasin
 SJK (T) Ladang Bukit Asahan
 SJK (T) Ladang Bukit Kajang
 SJK (T) Ladang Diamond Jubilee
 SJK (T) Ladang Jasin Lalang
 SJK (T) Ladang Serkam
 SJK (T) Merlimau
 SJK (T) Batang Melaka

Melaka Tengah District
 SJK (T) Bukit Lintang
 SJK (T) Melaka Kubu
 SJK (T) Paya Rumput

Alor Gajah District
 SJK (T) Alor Gajah
 SJK (T) Durian Tunggal
 SJK (T) Kemuning
 SJK (T) Ladang Gadek
 SJK (T) Ladang Kemuning
 SJK (T) Ladang Sungai Baru
 SJK (T) Ladang Tebong
 SJK (T) Pekan Tebong
 SJK (T) Pulau Sebang
 SJK (T) Rumbia

National Secondary School - Sekolah Menengah Kebangsaan

Sekolah Berasrama Penuh (Kerajaan)
 Sekolah Menengah Sains Muzaffar Syah
 Sekolah Berasrama Penuh Integrasi Selandar
 Maktab Rendah Sains MARA Tun Ghafar Baba

Sekolah Menengah Teknik
 Sekolah Menengah Teknik Bukit Piatu
 Sekolah Menengah Teknik Datuk Seri Mohd Zin
 Sekolah Menengah Teknik Jasin
 Sekolah Menengah Teknik Melaka Tengah

Former missionary schools(1826-1976) - Sekolah Menengah Kebangsaan(1977-current)

Malacca High School  (SMK TINGGI MELAKA)
St. David High School  (SMK TINGGI ST DAVID)
Methodist Girls' School  (SMK PEREMPUAN METHODIST)
Infant Jesus Convent, Malacca  (SMK INFANT JESUS CONVENT)
St. Francis Institution  (SMK ST FRANCIS)
Canossa Convent High School  (SMK CANOSSA CONVENT) 
Methodist (ACS) High School  (SMK METHODIST (ACS))

Secondary education: Sekolah Menengah Kebangsaan (SMK) 

 Sekolah Menengah Kebangsaan Agama
 Sekolah Menengah Kebangsaan Agama Sultan Muhammad
 Sekolah Menengah Kebangsaan Agama Sharifah Rodziah
 Sekolah Menengah Tahfiz Al-Quran
 Sekolah Menengah Tahfiz Al-Quran Chenderah
 Sekolah Menengah Tahfiz Al-Quran Padang Temu
 Sekolah Menengah Agama
 Sekolah Menengah Agama Al-Ehya Al-Karim
 Sekolah Menengah Agama Al-Ahmadi
 Sekolah Menengah Arab
 Sekolah Menengah Arab As-Syakirin
 Sekolah Menengah Arab Darul Falah
 Sekolah Menengah Arab Al-Asyraf
 Sekolah Menengah Arab Assaiyidah Khadijah

Boarding School 
 Kolej Yayasan Saad

References